Spartak Volgograd is a men's and women's water polo club based in the city of Volgograd, Russia.

History (men's team)
Spartak Volgograd was founded in 1994. However, the water polo department was established two years later. Spartak was succeeding right after its foundation, winning the title of the Russian Championship in 1997 and finishing in second place in 1998. Furthermore, the club became fourth at the LEN Champions League during that period. Spartak won the 2013–14 LEN Euro Cup, a European second-tier club competition.

Titles and achievements (men's team)

Domestic competitions 
Russian League
 Winners (12): 1996–97, 1998–99, 2002–03, 2003–04, 2009–10, 2010–11, 2011–12, 2012–13, 2013–14, 2014–15, 2015–16, 2016–17

European competitions 
LEN Champions League
 4th place (1): 1997–98
LEN Euro Cup
 Winners (1): 2013–14

External links 
 Official site

Sport in Volgograd
Water polo clubs in Russia